Nirop (translation: Farewell) is a 2007 Marathi film directed by Sachin Kundalkar and produced by Aparna Dharmadhikari under the banner "Salaam Cinema". The film stars Sameer Dharmadhikari and Devika Daftardar in lead roles.

The film won the Best Feature Film in Marathi Award at the 55th National Film Awards. The award citation mentions the film as "An original offbeat film that gives a fresh perspective of the internal landscapes of the human mind".

Plot
Shekhar (Sameer Dharmadhikari) and Jui (Devika Daftardar) are married for three years and are a relatively happy couple. Shekhar is a flautist and has a music assignment in France. Before leaving for France, he wants to visit his hometown one last time. So he takes a short trip to Konkan, along with Jui. On their holiday, they are joined by their friends; Shekhar’s bold and forward friend and MTV Producer Tara, his French music companion Per Barrow and Jui's brother Ishant who aspires to be a music director.

In the tranquility and peacefulness of the place, each character recognises their inner discontent. Everyone realises the unhappiness behind their seemingly happy lives. Finally when they are ready to leave, several of them realise that the trip has been life-altering for them.

Cast
 Sameer Dharmadhikari as Shekhar
 Devika Daftardar as Jui
 Gauri Kulkarni as Tara
 Astad Kale as Ishant
 Seema Deshmukh as Sarita
 Cyrille Larrieu as Pierre Bérault
 Shreeram Ranade
 Ujwala Jog

Awards
National Film Awards
 Won - National Film Award for Best Feature Film in Marathi

References

2007 films
Best Marathi Feature Film National Film Award winners
2000s Marathi-language films
Films directed by Sachin Kundalkar